Empathy is a 1962 album by jazz musicians Bill Evans and Shelly Manne. It was recorded and released by Verve Records, the label Evans joined a year after the recording session. The album came about when Manne and Evans were sharing a bill at New York's Village Vanguard nightclub, and Verve producer Creed Taylor proposed a studio collaboration for the two bandleaders. Riverside Records, Evans' label during 1962, allowed Evans to participate, and the trio was completed by Manne's bass player of the time, Monty Budwig.

The sculpture on the album cover was by Sheldon Machlin.

Reception
Leonard Feather had this to say about the album in his April 11, 1963, review in DownBeat magazine: "Essentially the focus is on Evans, as it should be; yet because of the skill with which he and Manne cooperated, one is often conscious that an important interplay is involved, one that lifts the results far out of the normal piano-with-rhythm class."

Reviewing the album for AllMusic, David Nathan wrote: "[Evans'] playing seemed lighter, freer, and more relaxed than it had for a while.... Listening to these three [Evans, Manne, Budwig], it's clear that everyone was having a good time and simply enjoying being relieved of their duties with their regular combos, even if for just one day."

Track listing
"The Washington Twist" (Irving Berlin) – 6:26
"Danny Boy" (Frederick Weatherly) - 3:42
"Let's Go Back to the Waltz" (Irving Berlin) – 4:30
"With a Song in My Heart" (Richard Rodgers, Lorenz Hart) - 9:12
"Goodbye" (Gordon Jenkins) - 5:12
"I Believe in You" (Frank Loesser) - 5:52

Personnel
 Bill Evans - piano
 Monty Budwig - bass
 Shelly Manne - drums

References

External links
Jazz Discography entries for Bill Evans
Bill Evans Memorial Library discography

1962 albums
Verve Records albums
Bill Evans albums
Albums produced by Creed Taylor
Albums recorded at Van Gelder Studio